Johann Nepomuk von Nostitz-Rieneck (24 March 1768 – 22 October 1840) commanded a cavalry division in the army of the Austrian Empire during the Napoleonic Wars.

Career
Johann Nepomuk was born on 24 March 1768 in Prague, the ninth child of Count Franz Anton von Nostitz-Rieneck (1725-1794) and Countess Marie Alžběta Krakovská z Kolowrat (1728-1815). His father was the High Burggraf of Bohemia. His father's younger brother was Friedrich Moritz von Nostitz-Rieneck, a high-ranking Austrian general who became president of the Aulic Council shortly before his death in 1796.

In 1784, he entered the Habsburg monarchy's military establishment and fought in the Austro-Turkish War. He served with distinction in the Flanders Campaign and was wounded at Tourcoing in 1794. He retired from the army at the end of 1796, but returned to military service as a general officer in late 1800.

In 1805, he led a brigade at Dürrenstein, Schöngrabern, and Austerlitz. In 1809, he fought at Aspern-Essling and led a cavalry division at Wagram. In 1813, he served at Dresden and led a division of cuirassiers at Leipzig. The following year, he fought at Arcis-sur-Aube and Fère-Champenoise. He became Proprietor (Inhaber) of a light cavalry regiment from 1814 until his death in 1840.

Family
Nostitz married Countess Sofia Apraxina (b. 1778) at Karlsruhe on 27 January 1797. She bore him four children, Eduard who died in 1797 as an infant, Elisabeth (1799–1884), Karl (1801–1802), and Adelheid (1802–1887). Sofia died on 22 April 1802, three weeks after giving birth to Adelheid. On 28 June 1803, Nostitz wed Gräfin Antonie Josefa Schlick von Passaun (b. 1783). She gave birth to seven children, Jan Nepomuk (1804?–1810), Ota (1804?–1821), Marie Philippine (1804–1876), Jan Josef (1805–1806), Albert (1807–1871), Hermann (1812–1895), and Sigmund (1815–1890). His second wife Antonie died on 18 August 1830. Nostitz died at Prague on 22 October 1840.

Notes

References

Austrian soldiers
Austrian generals
Austrian Empire commanders of the Napoleonic Wars
Austrian Empire military personnel of the Napoleonic Wars
Austrian Empire military personnel of the French Revolutionary Wars
Bohemian nobility
1768 births
1840 deaths